Gregory III Šubić of Bribir (died 1235) was a member of the Croatian Šubić noble family. He successfully fought a war with Count Domald and with Višan Šubić of Zvonigrad.

Šubić
Subic
Year of birth missing
1235 deaths